Jill Cohenour is a Democratic Party member of the Montana State Senate, representing District 42 since 2015.

External links
Montana House of Representatives - Jill Cohenour official MT State Legislature website
Project Vote Smart - Representative Jill Cohenour (MT) profile
Follow the Money - Jill Cohenour
2008 2006 2004 2002 campaign contributions

21st-century American politicians
21st-century American women politicians
Living people
Members of the Montana House of Representatives
People from Havre, Montana
Women state legislators in Montana
Year of birth missing (living people)